The year 1895 in art involved some significant events.

Events
 January 1 – Alphonse Mucha's lithographed poster for the play Gismonda starring Sarah Bernhardt is posted in Paris. Bernhardt is so satisfied with its success that she gives Mucha a six-year contract.
 April 13 – The Russian Museum is established in Saint Petersburg by Nicholas II.
 April 30 – First Venice Biennale opens.
 July 3 – Paul Gauguin leaves France to settle permanently in Polynesia.
 October – Edvard Munch exhibits an extended series of his Love paintings in Christiania.
 November – Paul Cézanne has his first solo exhibition, at the Paris gallery of Ambroise Vollard.
 Munch (probably) writes "Could only have been painted by a madman" (Kan kun være malet af en gal Mand!) on his 1893 painting The Scream.
 Bernard Berenson publishes Lorenzo Lotto: An Essay in Constructive Art Criticism.
 P. H. Emerson publishes his last photographic book, Marsh Leaves.
 M. H. de Young Memorial Museum opened in Golden Gate Park, San Francisco.

Works

 Lawrence Alma-Tadema – A Coign of Vantage
 Aubrey Beardsley – Venus Between Terminal Gods (ink drawing)
 John Cassidy – Statue of Edward Colston (Bristol)
 Paul Cézanne
 The Boy in the Red Vest
 Still Life with Cherub (approximate date)
 Edgar Degas
 After the Bath, Woman drying herself (probable latest date)
 Photographic self-portrait
 Thomas Eakins – Portrait of Maud Cook
 Paul Gauguin – Oviri (stoneware)
 Countess Feodora von Gleichen – Statue of Queen Victoria surrounded by children, Royal Victoria Hospital, Montreal
 J. W. Godward
 Mischief And Repose
 The Muse Erato At Her Lyre
 Winslow Homer
 Cannon Rock
 Northeaster
 George W. Joy
 The Bayswater Omnibus
 Joan of Arc
 Sir Frederic Leighton
 Candida
 Flaming June
 Lachrymae
 Listener
 The Maid with the Golden Hair
 A Study
 'Twixt hope and fear
 Isaac Levitan – Fresh Wind. Volga
 Juan Luna
 La Bulaqueña
 Tampuhan
 Henry Arthur McArdle – Battle of San Jacinto
 Louis Maurer – The Great Royal Buffalo Hunt
 Gustave Moreau – Jupiter and Semele
 Edvard Munch
 After the Fall of Man (Ashes)
 Jealousy
 Madonna
 Self-Portrait with Cigarette
 Self-Portrait with Skeleton Arm (lithograph)
 Roderic O'Conor – La Jeune Bretonne
 Pierre-Auguste Renoir – Gabrielle et Jean
 Tom Roberts – Bailed Up
 John Singer Sargent – Frederick Law Olmsted
 Carlos Schwabe – La mort du fossoyeur ("The Death of the Gravedigger")
 Valentin Serov – Portrait of Countess Varvara Musina-Pushkina
 Marianne Stokes – St. Elizabeth of Hungary Spinning for the Poor
 Théophile Steinlen – Les Chanteurs des Rues
 Vardges Sureniants – Desecrated Shrine
 Dorothy Tennant – L'Amour Blessé
 James Tissot – La femme préhistorique
 Henri de Toulouse-Lautrec – Portrait of Oscar Wilde
 Louis Tuaillon – Amazone zu Pferde (bronze equestrian statue, Berlin)
 Laurits Tuxen – The Wedding of Tsar Nicholas II
 John Henry Twachtman – The White Bridge (Minneapolis Institute of Arts)
 Félix Vallotton – Clair de lune ("Moonlight")
 J. Alden Weir – The Ice Cutters
 W. L. Wyllie – The Opening of Tower Bridge

Births
 January 21 – Cristóbal Balenciaga, Spanish fashion designer (died 1972)
 February 6 – Franz Radziwill, German painter (died 1983)
 March 1 – Ogura Yuki, Japanese nihonga painter (died 2000)
 March 4 – Mikuláš Galanda, Slovak modernist painter and illustrator (died 1938)
 March 29 – Anne Redpath, Scottish still life painter (died 1965)
 April 7
 Jim Ede, English art collector (died 1990)
 John Bernard Flannagan, American sculptor (suicide 1942)
 May 8 – Georg Muche, German painter (died 1987)
 June 3 – Frank McKelvey, Irish painter (died 1974)
 June 5 – William Roberts, British painter (died 1980)
 July 2 – Gen Paul, French painter and engraver (died 1975)
 July 19 – Xu Beihong, Chinese painter (died 1953)
 August 7 – Alain Saint-Ogan, French comics author and artist (died 1974)
 August 13 – Gluck, born Hannah Gluckstein, English painter (died 1978)
 August 17 – Talbert Abrams, American "father of aerial photography" (died 1990)
 November 1 – David Jones, British poet and painter (died 1974)
 December 26 – Jefto Perić, Serbian painter (died 1967)
 date unknown
 Ilija Bašičević, Serbian painter and father of painter-sculptor Dimitrije Bašičević (died 1972)
 Marguerite Huré, French stained glass artist (died 1967)

Deaths
 January 5 – Władysław Podkowiński, Polish painter and illustrator (born 1866)
 February 1 – Mary Thornycroft, English sculptor (born 1809)
 February 8 – Jean-François Portaels, Belgian painter (born 1818)
 March 2 – Berthe Morisot, French Impressionist painter (born 1841)
 March 6 – Edwin Forbes, American landscape painter and etcher (born 1839)
 April 19 – Sir George Scharf, English art critic (born 1820)
 April 21 – Arthur Gilbert, English landscape painter (born 1819)
 May 24 – Joseph Quinaux, Belgian landscape painter (born 1822)
 September 9 – Gaetano Milanesi, Italian art historian (born 1813)
 September 21 – Silvestro Lega, Italian realist painter (born 1826)
 November 23 – Mauritz de Haas, Dutch-American marine painter (born 1832)

References

 
Years of the 19th century in art
1890s in art